Charles H. Durkee (December 10, 1805January 14, 1870) was an American pioneer, Congressman, and United States Senator from Wisconsin.  He was one of the founders of Kenosha, Wisconsin, and was a Governor of the Utah Territory in the last five years of his life.

Early life
Durkee was born in Royalton, Vermont. He became a merchant and moved to the Wisconsin Territory in 1836. There he became involved in agriculture and lumbering, and was a founder of the town of Southport (later Kenosha, Wisconsin). Land he once owned in Kenosha is now part of the Library Park Historic District.

Career
He entered politics, serving two terms in the Wisconsin Territorial Legislature. Originally a Democrat, he became a member first of the Liberty Party and then of the Free Soil Party and was elected to the United States House of Representatives in 1848 as part of Wisconsin's first full congressional delegation. He served in the House for two terms as part of the 31st and the 32nd Congresses from March 4, 1849, till March 3, 1853, representing Wisconsin's 1st congressional district. In 1854, he switched to the newly formed Republican Party and was elected to the United States Senate by the Wisconsin State Legislature. He served for one term, from 1855 to 1861. In 1865 he became governor of the Utah Territory, and served in that position until 1869 when he resigned because of ill health. He died in Omaha, Nebraska while returning home.

Tributes
A street in the city of Appleton, Wisconsin, is named for him.  An elementary school in Kenosha, Wisconsin, bore his name for many years. It was demolished in 2008.

He gave a speech at the hammering of the Golden Spike in Promontory, Utah, on May 10, 1869, connecting the Union Pacific tracks to the Central Pacific Railroad.

His former home, which later became an Episcopal school for girls and is now known as Kemper Hall, is listed on the National Register of Historic Places.

References

Further reading

External links

 

1805 births
1870 deaths
Governors of Utah Territory
Members of the Wisconsin Territorial Legislature
Members of the United States House of Representatives from Wisconsin
People from Royalton, Vermont
Wisconsin Republicans
Utah Republicans
Wisconsin Free Soilers
Republican Party United States senators from Wisconsin
Free Soil Party members of the United States House of Representatives
19th-century American politicians
Wisconsin Libertyites
Wisconsin Democrats